Loïck Landre (born 5 May 1992) is a French professional footballer who plays for Qatari club Al-Shamal. He plays as a centre-back but can also be utilized as a right-back.

Landre is a France youth international having earned caps at under-19 and under-20 level.

Career
On 20 June 2011, Landre signed his first professional contract agreeing to a three-year deal with Paris Saint-Germain until 2014. After going without an appearing during the fall campaign, he joined Ligue 2 team Clermont on loan and made his professional debut on 14 January 2012 in a league match against Amiens. Two weeks later, he received his first professional red card in a 2–1 win over Bastia. Landre is of Guadeloupean descent through his parents who are originally from Sainte-Rose. For the 2012–13 season, Landre signed a one-year loan deal with Gazélec Ajaccio.

On 18 July 2013, he left Paris to sign for Ligue 2 side RC Lens on a free transfer.

On 17 January 2017, Landre signed for Serie A side Genoa.

He moved to Nîmes Olympique in summer 2018.

References

External links

 
 
 
 
 
 

1992 births
Sportspeople from Aubervilliers
Footballers from Seine-Saint-Denis
French people of Guadeloupean descent
Living people
French footballers
France youth international footballers
France under-21 international footballers
Association football defenders
Association football fullbacks
Paris Saint-Germain F.C. players
Clermont Foot players
Gazélec Ajaccio players
RC Lens players
Pisa S.C. players
Nîmes Olympique players
Manisa FK footballers
Al-Shamal SC players
Ligue 1 players
Ligue 2 players
Serie B players
TFF First League players
Qatar Stars League players
French expatriate footballers
French expatriate sportspeople in Italy
Expatriate footballers in Italy
French expatriate sportspeople in Turkey
Expatriate footballers in Turkey
French expatriate sportspeople in Qatar
Expatriate footballers in Qatar